The 1984 UNLV Rebels football team was an American football team that represented the University of Nevada, Las Vegas in the Pacific Coast Athletic Association during the 1984 NCAA Division I-A football season. In their third year under head coach Harvey Hyde, the team compiled an 11–2 record. In March 1985, the NCAA forced UNLV to forfeit all of its victories from their 1983 and 1984 seasons due to playing with ineligible players.

Schedule

References

College football winless seasons
UNLV
UNLV Rebels football seasons
UNLV Rebels football